Pionidae is a family of prostigs in the order Trombidiformes. There are about 15 genera and at least 90 described species in Pionidae.

Genera
 Forelia Haller, 1882
 Huitfeldtia Thor, 1898
 Hydrochoreutes C. L. Koch, 1837
 Najadicola Piersig, 1897
 Nautarachna Moniez, 1888
 Neotiphys Habeeb, 1957
 Piona C. L. Koch, 1842
 Pionacercus Piersig, 1894
 Pionella Viets, 1937
 Pionopsis Piersig, 1894
 Pseudofeltria Soar, 1904
 Schminkea
 Tiphys C. L. Koch, 1836
 Twinforksella
 Wettina Piersig, 1892

References

Further reading

 
 
 
 

Trombidiformes
Acari families